Basil Moloney (born 10 February 1941) is a former Australian rules footballer who played for the Richmond Football Club in the Victorian Football League (VFL).

Notes

External links 
		

Living people
1941 births
Australian rules footballers from Victoria (Australia)
Richmond Football Club players
Warracknabeal Football Club players